The Ballard Avenue Historic District is a section of downtown Ballard in Seattle, Washington, that was listed on the National Register of Historic Places in 1976 (ID #76001885). The district consists of Ballard Avenue N.W. between N.W. Market Street and N.W. Dock Place, and is located near to and along Salmon Bay. After initial work by the Ballard Avenue Association and the city of Seattle's Urban Conservation Division, Seattle mayor Wes Uhlman signed the ordinances that led to the national recognition of the area. The neighborhood of Ballard is known for a large historic population and presence of immigrants from Sweden, and King Gustaf of Sweden read the proclamation inducting the district to the historical registry in 1976, and at the same time dedicated the new bell tower at Ballard's Marvin's Garden Park, which housed the original bell from Ballard's old city hall.  The historic markers that can be seen on 26 of the buildings were created and erected by the Ballard Historical Society.

All the commercial buildings in the historic district face towards Ballard Avenue. Other locations in Ballard that are listed on the National Register of Historic Places include the old Ballard Carnegie Library on N.W. Market Street, the Ballard Bridge, Fire Station No. 18, the Hiram M. Chittenden Locks, and the Lake Washington Ship Canal.

References

External links

 "Nordic Knits And Lutefisk In Seattle"
 "One day in Seattle: How to see the top spots"
 "Fight looms over replacing Ballard's old Sunset Hotel"
 "Ballard hopes its old spirit can endure condo onslaught"
 Ballard Avenue Historic District--Seattle, Washington: A National Register of Historic Places Travel Itinerary
 Seattle.gov, Ballard Avenue Landmark District
 Historylink.org Ballard tour

Ballard, Seattle
Historic districts on the National Register of Historic Places in Washington (state)
National Register of Historic Places in Seattle
Swedish-American culture in Washington (state)